Sankat City is a 2009 Indian Hindi-language black comedy film directed by Pankaj Advani starring Kay Kay Menon. The film was released in India on 10 July 2009.

Plot
Guru (Kay Kay Menon) and Ganpat (Dilip Prabhavalkar) are small-time car thieves. One night, they steal a Mercedes Rs. 10 million inside, unaware that the car belongs to a vicious gangster/loan shark called Faujdaar (Anupam Kher). They try to sell the stolen Mercedes to Suleman Supari (Rahul Dev), a hitman, who recognizes the car and notifies his friend Faujdaar. Faujdaar sends his henchman with Guru to get back the cash.

Meanwhile, Ganpat has hidden cash in a safe place. After an accident, he loses his memory. Angered by the chain of events, Faujdaar gives Guru three days to return the money.

Cast
Kay Kay Menon - Guru
Anupam Kher - Faujdar
Rimi Sen - Mona
Chunky Pandey - Sikandar Khan and Sheshaiyya (Dual role)
Dilip Prabhawalkar - Ganpat
Rahul Dev - Suleman Supari
Yashpal Sharma - Pachisia
Hemant Pandey - Filip Fattu
Virendra Saxena - Godman
Shrivallabh Vyas - Sharafat
Manoj Pahwa - Gogi Kukreja
Kurush Deboo - Bawajee
Sanjay Mishra - Lingam

Soundtrack
The music was composed by Ranjit Barot and released by Venus Worldwide Entertainment. All lyrics were written by Panchhi Jalonvi and Mehboob.

Critical reception
Sankat City received generally negative reviews from film critics as a dark comedy.

Nominations in 2010 
  Nominated for Most  Promising Debut Director, 55th Filmfare Awards. 
  Nominated for Best Director and Best Film; Searchlight Awards - Max  Stardust Awards 2010.
  Nominated for Best Screenplay, Most Promising Debut Director, and Best Ensemble Cast;  Nokia 16th Star Screen Award.

References

External links
 
 The Sankat City Blogs on PassionForCinema.com
  Nominations for 55th Filmfare Awards
  Nominations for Max Stardust Awards
 Nominations for Nokia 16th Star screen Awards

2000s Hindi-language films
2009 films
2009 black comedy films
Indian black comedy films
Films scored by Ranjit Barot
2009 directorial debut films